Oleksiy Shevchenko (born 24 February 1992) is a Ukrainian professional footballer who plays as a goalkeeper for Ukrainian Premier League club Shakhtar Donetsk.

Career
Shevchenko is product of youth team system FC Inter Dnipropetrovsk. Made his debut for FC Metalurh entering as a full-time playing against Lviv on 13 October 2011 in Ukrainian First League.

On 30 August 2013, Oleksiy had signed a 5-year contract with the Ukrainian giants Dynamo Kyiv.

On 17 June 2018, Oleksiy had signed a 5-year contract with the Ukrainian giants Shakhtar Donetsk.

International career
Shevchenko got his first call up to the senior Ukraine side for 2018 FIFA World Cup qualifiers against Turkey and Kosovo in October 2016.

Honours
Shakhtar Donetsk
 Ukrainian Premier League: 2018–19
 Ukrainian Cup: 2018–19

Career statistics

Club

References

External links
 
 

1992 births
Living people
Footballers from Dnipro
Ukrainian footballers
Ukraine student international footballers
Ukraine under-21 international footballers
Ukraine youth international footballers
Ukrainian Premier League players
Ukrainian First League players
Ukrainian Second League players
FC Metalurh Zaporizhzhia players
FC Metalurh-2 Zaporizhzhia players
FC Hoverla Uzhhorod players
FC Olimpik Donetsk players
Association football goalkeepers
FC Torpedo Kutaisi players
FC Dila Gori players
Ukrainian expatriate footballers
Expatriate footballers in Georgia (country)
Ukrainian expatriate sportspeople in Georgia (country)
FC Zorya Luhansk players
FC Karpaty Lviv players
FC Shakhtar Donetsk players